The 2013–14 CERH Women's European League was the 8th season of Europe's premier female club roller hockey competition organized by CERH. Sixteen teams from seven national associations qualified to the competition as a result of their respective national league placing in the previous season. Following several knockout rounds, the four best teams contested a final four tournament won by CP Alcorcón, which took place in Coutras.

Contesting Teams

Knockout stage

Final four
The final-four round was played at US Coutras's ground, the Patinoire Milou Ducourtioux, Coutras, in France between the days 15 and 16 of March 2014.

Semi-finals

Relegation match

Final

See also
2013–14 CERH European League
2013–14 CERS Cup

References

External links
 CERH website
  Roller Hockey links worldwide
  Mundook-World Roller Hockey

Rink Hockey European Female League
2013 in French women's sport
2014 in French women's sport
International roller hockey competitions hosted by France
CERH
CERH